Metsähovi may refer to:
 2486 Metsähovi, a main-belt asteroid
 Metsähovi Radio Observatory, Finland